Terminus is the tenth and the final studio album by Japanese band Garnet Crow. It album was released on March 20, 2013 by Giza Studio. The album consist of one previously released single, Nostalgia.

Commercial performance 
The album reached #9 rank in Oricon for first week with 11,043 sold copies. It charted for 6 weeks and sold 13,884 copies.

Track listing 
All tracks are composed by Yuri Nakamura, written by Nana Azuki and arranged by Hirohito Furui.

Usage in media
Nostalgia was used as ending theme for program Happy Music

References 

2013 albums
2013 songs
Being Inc. albums
Japanese-language albums
Giza Studio albums
Garnet Crow albums